Vermont's 4th congressional district is an obsolete district. It was created in 1803.  It was eliminated after the 1850 Census.   Its last Congressman was Thomas Bartlett, Jr.

List of members representing the district

References

 Congressional Biographical Directory of the United States 1774–present

04
Former congressional districts of the United States
1853 disestablishments in Vermont
1803 establishments in Vermont
Constituencies established in 1803
Constituencies disestablished in 1853